Somme-Bionne is a commune in the Marne department in north-eastern France. An important Iron Age chariot burial of 450-300 BC was found in the vicinity of the village in the nineteenth century. The finds from the La Tène period  grave came into the possession of the French collector Léon Morel, who sold it, along with his entire antiquities collection from the Champagne region of France, to the British Museum in 1901.

See also
Communes of the Marne department

References

Gallery

Finds from the Somme-Bionne chariot burial

See also
 Iron Age France
 La Tène culture

Sommebionne